Joseph John "Joe" Urusemal (born March 19, 1952) is a Micronesian political figure who served as the sixth President of the Federated States of Micronesia from 2003 until 2007.

Urusemal is married to former First Lady Olania Latileilam, who is from Satawal. The couple have four children: B.J., Tarsis, Craig and Elenita.

Early life

Urusemal was born on the island of Woleai in the State of Yap.  He attended secondary school on the island of Chuuk (then called Truk) at Xavier High School, a Jesuit institution.  He would graduate from Xavier in 1976.

Urusemal went on to attend and graduate from Rockhurst University (then called Rockhurst College) in Kansas City, Missouri, United States. He holds a Bachelor of Arts degree in Administration of Justice from Rockhurst, a Roman Catholic Jesuit university.  Upon graduation, Urusemal accepted a position with the Jackson County, Missouri, government, including the county Department of Corrections until he returned to Micronesia in 1982.

Following his return to Micronesia, Urusemal became a teacher and guidance counselor for the Outer Islands High School on his native Yap.

Political career
Urusemal was elected to four-year term in the Fifth Congress of the Federated States of Micronesia in 1987.  He was elected as Yap's at-large representative.  Urusemal rose to leadership positions during his parliamentary career.  He served as  Floor Leader for twelve years during the Seventh until the Twelfth FSM congresses.

During his political career representing Yap, Urusemal served on several congressional committees including Health, Education and Social Affairs and the Judiciary and Governmental Operations committees.

The president and vice president of the Federated States of Micronesia are elected directly by Congress and must be a duly elected member at the time of election. Due to the defeat of the then-incumbent president, Leo Falcam, in the previous elections, Falcam was unable to stand for re-election. On May 11, 2003, Congress elected Urusemal as President and he took office immediately.

On May 11, 2007, the 15th Congress convened. A  new presidential election was held and Manny Mori was elected president. He likewise took office immediately.

External links
Official Biography of Joseph J. Urusemal
Pacific Magazine: Yap Gets FSM Presidency:Urusemal Was A Surprise To Some
Pacific Magazine: FSM: Yap leader is new FSM president
Chuuk's Manny Mori New FSM President

1952 births
Living people
People from Yap State
Presidents of the Federated States of Micronesia
Members of the Congress of the Federated States of Micronesia
Rockhurst University alumni
Federated States of Micronesia Roman Catholics
Federated States of Micronesia expatriates in the United States